Wilson College may refer to:
 Wilson College (Pennsylvania), Chambersburg, Pennsylvania, United States
 Warren Wilson College, Asheville, North Carolina, United States
 Lindsey Wilson College, Columbia, Kentucky, United States
 Wilson College, Princeton University, Princeton, New Jersey, United States
 Wilson College, Mumbai, India
 Wilson College, California, precursor to the University of Southern California, in Wilmington, Los Angeles